ORP Burza was a  of the Polish Navy which saw action in World War II.

Building
ORP Burza (squall or storm) was ordered on 2 April 1926 from the French shipyard Chantiers Navals Français together with her sister ship . She entered service in 1932 (about four years after the intended delivery date), and her first commander was kmdr Bolesław Sokołowski.

Service history
The British ships led the Polish ships to Leith, and at night the Polish destroyers arrived at Rosyth.

In 1940 Burza supported British forces off Norway in April and in the English Channel in May. On 4 May Burza came alongside the battleship  and took aboard Polish survivors who had survived the sinking of ORP Grom earlier that day.

At 16.20 the Allied vessels opened fire on enemy armoured column at Sangatte Hill west of Calais. 10 minutes later they were attacked by 27 German aircraft which hit and sank Wessex. Vimiera managed to escape.

Then the entire enemy air group concentrated on the Polish destroyer. Shrapnel hits jammed her two 40 mm anti-aircraft guns. Three bombs exploded in the water, damaging her boilers and reducing her speed. Then two bombs exploded in the water near or in her bows, forcing Burza to return to Dover stern first Midshipman Konstanti Okolow-Zubkowski serving on Burza recalled that when back at Dover an admiral came aboard complaining that debris was being thrown over the side of the ship. The admiral, when shown the forepeak, apologised, not having realised how badly damaged Burza was.

After major repairs in Portsmouth, Burza escorted convoy HX 217 as part of Escort Group B6. While attached to Escort Group B-3, Burza escorted convoys ONS 167, HX 228, and SL 147/MKS 38. Burza was detached from ONS 167 to defend Convoy ON 166. While attached to Support Group 8, Burza escorted convoy SC 145 and the October 1943 convoy to establish British air bases in the Azores.

In 1944 Burza became a training ship. In 1945 she became a submarine tender for Polish submarines. The Polish crew left Burza in 1946, when she was transferred to the Royal Navy.

In 1951 the ship was returned to the Polish Navy and towed to Gdynia in July. Burza was overhauled and entered service in 1955. In 1960 she became a museum ship. After Błyskawica replaced her in that role she was scrapped in 1977.

Armament
1932–1940:
 Four 130 mm Schneider-Creusot guns (4x1)
 Two 40 mm Vickers-Armstrongs AA cannons (2x1)
 Four 13,2 mm Hotchkiss AA machine guns (2x2), from 1935
 Six torpedo tubes 550/533 mm (2x3)
 Two depth charge launchers
 One Thornycroft depth charge thrower
 30 mines

1940–1942:
 Four 130 mm Schneider-Creusot guns (4x1)
 One 76 mm Mk Vna gun
 Two 40 mm Vickers-Armstrongs AA cannons (2x1)
 Four 13,2 mm Hotchkiss AA machine guns (2x2)
 Eight 12,7 Vickers AA machine guns (2x4)
 Three torpedo tubes 550/533 mm (1x3)
 Two depth charge launchers
 Two Thornycroft depth charge throwers

1942–1946:
 Two 130 mm Schneider-Creusot guns (2x1)
 One 76 mm Mk Vna gun
 Four 40 mm AA Mk VIII cannons (1x4)
 Four 20 mm AA Oerlikon cannons
 Three torpedo tubes 550/533 mm (1x3)
 One hedgehog
 Two depth charge launchers
 Four Thornycroft depth charge throwers

From 1955:
 Four 100 mm guns (4x1)
 Eight 37 mm AA cannons (4x2)
 One depth charge launcher
 Four depth charge throwers

See also
 List of ships of the Polish Navy

References

Sources

1929 ships
Wicher-class destroyers
World War II destroyers of Poland
Cold War destroyers of Poland